Victoria Wright  (born 15 August 1993) is a retired Scottish curler from Stranraer, and 2022 Olympic Champion in women's curling, playing third on Team Muirhead.

Career
Before playing for Muirhead, Wright curled for Hannah Fleming. She was the alternate for Scotland at the 2013 World Junior Curling Championships, where the team won a silver medal. She won the 2018 Scottish Women's Curling Championship as lead for Fleming to qualify for her first World Championship. At the 2018 World Women's Curling Championship, the team struggled, finishing the round robin with a 5–7 record.

For the 2018–19 season, Wright joined team Muirhead as the alternate. She played for the team at the first leg of the 2018–19 Curling World Cup as Muirhead had a hip injury. They finished in sixth with a 2–4 record. She played in her first European Curling Championships at the 2018 European Curling Championships. The team had a disappointing performance, finishing with a 4–5 record and missing the playoffs. At the 2019 Scottish Women's Curling Championships, the team qualified for the final but lost to Sophie Jackson 11–7. Wright also played in the International Mixed Doubles Dumfries that season with Craig Waddell where they lost in the quarterfinals. To finish off the season, Team Muirhead won the 2019 WCT Arctic Cup.

The following season, Wright replaced Vicki Chalmers on the team due to Chalmers stepping away from competitive curling. The team won their first event of the 2019–20 season, the 2019 Cameron's Brewing Oakville Fall Classic. At the 2019 European Curling Championships, the Muirhead rink reached the final where they lost to Sweden's Anna Hasselborg, claiming the silver medal. In early January, they won the Mercure Perth Masters. Team Muirhead claimed the 2020 Scottish Women's Curling Championship by defeating Maggie Wilson 8–3 in the championship game. The team was set to represent Scotland at the 2020 World Women's Curling Championship before the event got cancelled due to the COVID-19 pandemic. In Grand Slam play, they played in three events and qualified in one of them, the 2019 National where they lost in the quarterfinals to Jennifer Jones.

Due to the ongoing pandemic, a limited number of tour events were held during the 2020–21 season. Team Muirhead did play in a series of domestic events put on by the British Curling Association, where they won the January Challenge event and finished runner-up to Team Gina Aitken in the Elite Finals. Wright and her mixed doubles partner Grant Hardie lost in the final of the December event to Jennifer Dodds and Bruce Mouat. A "curling bubble" was set up in Calgary, Canada in the spring, which hosted several events, including the 2021 World Women's Curling Championship and two slams. Team Muirhead competed in both the 2021 Champions Cup and the 2021 Players' Championship, failing to qualify at both events. The next week, the team represented Scotland at the World's, finishing with a disappointing 6–7, in eighth place.

The team won the gold medal at the 2022 Winter Olympics. On 17 May 2022, Wright announced her retirement from the sport.

Wright was appointed Member of the Order of the British Empire (MBE) in the 2022 Birthday Honours for services to curling.

Personal life
Wright studied nursing at Glasgow Caledonian University, and works as a nurse at Forth Valley Royal Hospital in Larbert. She is in a relationship with fellow curler Greg Drummond. In her youth she was also a swimmer. She currently lives in Stirling.

Teams

References

External links

1993 births
Living people
Alumni of Glasgow Caledonian University
British women nurses
Continental Cup of Curling participants
Curlers from Glasgow
Curlers from Stirling
People from Stranraer
Scottish female curlers
Scottish nurses
Sportspeople from Dumfries
Curlers at the 2022 Winter Olympics
Olympic curlers of Great Britain
Medalists at the 2022 Winter Olympics
Olympic gold medallists for Great Britain
Olympic medalists in curling
Scottish Olympic medallists
Members of the Order of the British Empire